Rosengårdcentret is a shopping centre located in Odense on the Danish island of Funen.

References

Shopping centres in Denmark
Odense
Retail companies established in 1971
Shopping malls established in 1971
1971 establishments in Denmark